

List of Ambassadors

Tibor Shalev-Schlosser (Non-Resident, Jerusalem) 2016 -
Yuval Rotem 2007 - 2013
Shmuel Moyal 1993 - 1995
Zohar Raz 1988 - 1991
Avraham Kidron (Non-Resident, Canberra) 1979 - 1982
Michael Elizur (Non-Resident, Canberra) 1974 - 1979
Moshe Erell (Non-Resident, Canberra) 1970 - 1974

References

Fiji
Israel